Taijiang National Park is a national park in Tainan, Taiwan.

History
Taijiang National Park was established in October 15, 2009.

Geology
The majority of the park is within the city of Tainan. In total, the park's planned area stretches from the southern sea wall of Qingshan Fishing Harbor to the south bank of the Yanshui River and is mostly public coastal land.

See also
 List of national parks in Taiwan

References

2009 establishments in Taiwan
Geography of Tainan
National parks of Taiwan
Protected areas established in 2009
Tourist attractions in Tainan